was a professional Go player.

Biography 
Miyashita became a 9 dan in 1960. He had many students, including Ishibashi Chinami, Hanawa Yasutoki, Tokimoto Hajime, Kanno Kiyonori, and Miyashita Suzue.

Titles & runners-up 

1913 births
1976 deaths
Japanese Go players